Fort Witsen, also Fort Tacaray, was a fort on the Dutch Gold Coast, established in 1665 near Takoradi. This fort was destroyed after a few years, and in 1684 the site was abandoned. A map from 1791 shows, however, that the Dutch had renewed their presence in the fort again. The fort was handed over to Britain, along with the entire Dutch Gold Coast, on 6 April 1872, owing to the provisions of the Anglo-Dutch Treaties of 1870-1871.

References

Buildings and structures completed in 1656
History of Ghana
Castles in Ghana
Dutch Gold Coast
1665 establishments in the Dutch Empire
Witsen